Malcolm Brown (10 August 1903 – 29 August 1967) was an American art director. He won an Oscar and was nominated for another in the category Best Art Direction.

Selected filmography
Brown won an Academy Awards for Best Art Direction and was nominated for another:
Won
 Somebody Up There Likes Me (1956)
Nominated
 I'll Cry Tomorrow (1955)

References

External links

American art directors
Best Art Direction Academy Award winners
1903 births
1967 deaths
American production designers